The Nordic Golf League is one of the third-tier men's professional golf tours, recognised by the European Tour, also known as the Satellite Tours. The top five players on the Order of Merit at the end of each season earn status to play on the second tier Challenge Tour for the following season. In 2020, due to the COVID-19 pandemic, other rules were decided for qualification for the 2021 Challenge Tour.

The tour is based in Scandinavia, and incorporates tournaments from the national tours of Denmark (Danish Golf Tour, currently titled as the ECCO Tour for sponsorship reasons), Finland (Finnish Tour) and Sweden (Swedish Golf Tour, currently titled as the MoreGolf Mastercard Tour for sponsorship reasons). Formerly, the Nordic Golf League incorporated tournaments from the now defunct Norwegian Golf Tour.

Beginning in July 2015, Nordic Golf League tournaments carry Official World Golf Ranking points.

Notable alumni, who went on to win on the European Tour include Lucas Bjerregaard, Alexander Björk, Kristoffer Broberg, Rikard Karlberg, Mikko Korhonen, Morten Ørum Madsen, Christian Nilsson, and Thorbjørn Olesen.

Order of Merit winners

See also
Danish Golf Tour
Finnish Tour
Norwegian Golf Tour
Swedish Golf Tour

Notes

References

External links

 
Professional golf tours
Golf in Denmark
Golf in Finland
Golf in Norway
Golf in Sweden